Crenavolva traillii, common name Traill's ovulid, is a species of sea snail, a marine gastropod mollusk in the family Ovulidae, the ovulids, cowry allies or false cowries.

Description
The size of the shell varies between 5 mm and 15 mm.

Distribution
This marine species occurs off Japan, in the Indo-Pacific and off Australia (Queensland).

References

 Adams, A. 1855. Description of thirty-nine new species of shells, from the collection of Hugh Cuming. Proceedings of the Zoological Society of London 1854(22): 130–138, pl. 28
 Schilder, F.A. 1941. Verwandtschaft und Verbreitung der Cypraeacea. Archiv für Molluskenkunde 73(2–3): 57–120, pl. 8-9 
 Cate, C.N. 1973. A systematic revision of the Recent cypraeid family Ovulidae. Veliger supplement 15: 1–116
 Wilson, B. 1993. Australian Marine Shells. Prosobranch Gastropods. Kallaroo, Western Australia : Odyssey Publishing Vol. 1 408 pp. 
 Fehse, D. 2002. Contribution to the knowledge of the Ovulidae (Mollusca: Gastropoda). X. The genus Crenavolva Cate, 1973. La Conchiglia 34(303): 23–55
 Lorenz F. & Fehse D. (2009) The living Ovulidae. A manual of the families of allied cowries: Ovulidae, Pediculariidae and Eocypraeidae. Hackenheim: Conchbooks.

External links
 

Ovulidae
Gastropods described in 1855